Phoradendron densum Trel. is a species of flowering plant in the sandalwood family known by the common name dense mistletoe. It is native to the western United States and northwestern Mexico, where it grows in various types of woodland habitat. It has been reported from California, Oregon, Arizona and Baja California. This mistletoe parasitizes species of cypress, including Arizona cypress (Cupressus arizonica), and juniper (Juniperus spp.).

It can be found tangled in the branches of its host tree, extending its own erect branches 30 to 50 centimeters. It has green leaves around a centimeter long and half a centimeter wide. It is dioecious, with male and female plants producing different forms of inflorescence with round, knoblike flowers. The female flowers yield spherical berries each about 4 millimeters wide and yellowish or pale pink when ripe.

References

External links
Jepson Manual Treatment - Phoradendron densum
Phoradendron densum - Photo gallery

densum
Parasitic plants
Flora of California
Flora of Baja California
Flora of Arizona
Flora of Oregon
Flora of the California desert regions
Flora of the Cascade Range
Flora of the Klamath Mountains
Natural history of the California chaparral and woodlands
Natural history of the California Coast Ranges
Natural history of the Peninsular Ranges
Natural history of the San Francisco Bay Area
Natural history of the Transverse Ranges
Flora without expected TNC conservation status
Taxa named by William Trelease